Dojangsan  is a mountain of Gyeongsangbuk-do, eastern South Korea. It has an elevation of 828 metres.

See also
List of mountains of Korea

References

Mountains of South Korea
Mountains of North Gyeongsang Province